Lucas Márquez may refer to:

 Lucas Márquez (footballer, born 1988), Argentine defender
 Lucas Márquez (footballer, born 1990), Argentine defender